Hurley Haywood (born May 4, 1948) is a retired American race car driver. Haywood has won multiple events, including five overall victories at the Rolex 24 at Daytona, three at the 24 Hours of Le Mans, and two at the 12 Hours of Sebring and was the third driver to complete the informal triple Crown of endurance racing. He is credited with the 1988 Trans-Am title, two IMSA GT Championship titles and 23 wins, three Norelco Cup championships, a SuperCar title and 18 IndyCar starts.

He won the 24 Hours of Le Mans in 1977 (Porsche 936), 1983 (Porsche 956) and 1994 (Dauer 962 Le Mans) and is tied as the most successful driver at the 24 Hours of Daytona with 5 wins (1973, 1975, 1977, 1979, and 1991). He won the 12 Hours of Sebring in 1973 and 1981. He also drove in the 1980 Indianapolis 500 finishing 18th. He represented IMSA four times in the International Race of Champions (1986, 1989, 1992, 1995). In 1970, he was drafted into the army where he served as Specialist 4 with the 164th Aviation Group near Saigon during the Vietnam war. After completing his tour of duty, he won his first IMSA GT title in 1971.

After Peter H. Gregg's death, Haywood was a spokesperson and executive with Brumos Automotive dealerships.

He is the honorary chief driving instructor at the Porsche Track Experience, held at the Barber Motorsports Park outside Birmingham, Alabama. Patrick Dempsey produced a documentary film, Hurley, about Haywood's life.

In honor of his historical achievements, he was invited to perform the ceremonial duties of Grand Marshal at the 2019 24 Hours of Le Mans.

Personal life 
In February 2018, Haywood publicly came out as gay in his autobiography Hurley: From The Beginning.

In June 2019, to mark the 50th anniversary of the Stonewall riots, an event widely considered a watershed moment in the modern LGBTQ rights movement, Queerty named him one of the Pride50 "trailblazing individuals who actively ensure society remains moving towards equality, acceptance and dignity for all queer people".

Awards

He was inducted into the Motorsports Hall of Fame of America in 2005.

Racing Results

24 Hours of Le Mans results

24 Hours of Daytona results

PPG Indycar Series

(key) (Races in bold indicate pole position)

References

Further reading

External links
 

1948 births
Living people
Indianapolis 500 drivers
International Race of Champions drivers
SCCA Formula Super Vee drivers
Trans-Am Series drivers
Rolex Sports Car Series drivers
24 Hours of Le Mans drivers
24 Hours of Le Mans winning drivers
24 Hours of Daytona drivers
American Le Mans Series drivers
Champ Car drivers
Racing drivers from Chicago
American LGBT sportspeople
LGBT people from Illinois
Gay sportsmen
IMSA GT Championship drivers
United States Army personnel of the Vietnam War
World Sportscar Championship drivers
12 Hours of Sebring drivers
LGBT racing drivers
United States Army soldiers